The 1930 First District A&M Indians football team represented First District Agricultural and Mechanical College—now known as Arkansas State University—as a member of the Arkansas Intercollegiate Conference (AIC) during the 1930 college football season. Led by sixth-year head coach Herbert Schwartz, the Indians compiled an overall record of 1–4–3 with a mark of 0–3–1 in conference play. The 1930 season marked the first for Arkansas State as a four-year senior college after being elevated from a two-year junior college.

Schedule

References

Arkansas State
Arkansas State Red Wolves football seasons
Arkansas State Indians football